This is a list of school districts in South Carolina, sorted alphabetically.

A

Abbeville County School District 
Aiken County Public School District 
Allendale County School District 
Anderson County School District 1 
Anderson County School District 2 
Anderson County School District 3 
Anderson County School District 4 
Anderson County School District 5

B

Bamberg County School District 1 
Bamberg County School District 2 
Barnwell County Auditory-Verbal Center
Barnwell County School District 19 
Barnwell County School District 29 - see Williston County School District 29
Barnwell  County School District 45
Beaufort County School District 
Beaufort-Jasper Career
Berkeley County School District

C

Calhoun County School District
Charleston County School District
Charter Institute at Erskine
Cherokee County School District 
Chester County School District 
Chesterfield County School District 
Clarendon  County School District 1 
Clarendon  County School District 2 (Manning) 
Clarendon  County School District 3 (Turbeville) 
Colleton County School District
Cope Auditory-Verbal Center

D

Darlington 
Dillon 3 (Latta)
Dillon 4 (Dillon/Lake View)
Dorchester 2
Dorchester 4

E
Edgefield County School District

F

Fairfield
Florence 1 (South and West Florence)
Florence 2 (Pamlico)
Florence 3 (Lake City)
Florence 4 (Timmonsville)
Florence 5 (Johnsonville)

G

Georgetown
Greenville
Greenwood 50 (Greenwood)
Greenwood 51 (Ware Shoals) 
Greenwood 52 (Ninety Six)

H

Hampton 1 (Hampton)
Hampton 2 (Estill)
Horry

J
Jasper

K
Kershaw

L

Lancaster
Laurens 55 (Laurens)
Laurens 56 (Clinton)
Lee
Lexington 1 (Gilbert, Lexington, Pelion)
Lexington 2 (Cayce, Springdale, West Columbia)
Lexington 3 (Batesburg-Leesville)
Lexington 4 (Gaston & Swansea)
Lexington-Richland 5 (Chapin, Irmo, St. Andrews)

M

Marion County School District
Marlboro 
McCormick

N
Newberry

O

Oconee 
Orangeburg Consolidated 3 (Elloree, Holly Hill) 
Orangeburg Consolidated 4 (Branchville, Cordova, Cope)
Orangeburg Consolidated 5 (Bowman, North, Orangeburg)

P
Pickens

R

Richland 1 (Columbia)
Richland 2 (NE Columbia, Spring Valley) 
Richland-Lexington 5 - see Lexington-Richland 5

S

Saluda 
South Carolina Public Charter School District
Spartanburg County School District 1 (Campobello, Inman, Landrum)
Spartanburg County School District 2 (Boiling Springs, Chesnee, Inman, Mayo)
Spartanburg County School District 3 (Cowpens, Pacolet, Spartanburg)
Spartanburg County School District 4 (Woodruff)
Spartanburg County School District 5 (Duncan, Lyman, Wellford, Reidville, Moore)
Spartanburg County School District 6 (Moore, Pauline, Roebuck, Spartanburg)
Spartanburg County School District 7 (Spartanburg Downtown/East)
Sumter 2 (outer Sumter County) 
Sumter 17 (central Sumter County)

U
Union

W

Williamsburg
Willimston  29

Y

York 1 (York)
York 2 (Clover)
York 3 (Rock Hill)
York 4 (Fort Mill)

South Carolina
School districts
School districts
Schools in South Carolina